La Guarimba International Film Festival is a cultural association and an international film festival that annually takes place in Amantea (Calabria) and which shows short films from all over the world, divided into the following categories:  Fiction, Animation, Documentary, Insomnia, Music Video and La Grotta dei Piccoli - children's film selection.

La Guarimba was born in 2012 when a group of friends decided to work with the aim of reopening the only cinema in the small town of Amantea in southern Italy.

La Guarimba uses culture as a vehicle to promote values of participatory democracy, integration, human rights and accessibility. The motto of the association is "Bringing the cinema back to the people and the people back to the cinema".

History 
In 2012, the artistic director of La Guarimba, Giulio Vita, returned to his hometown, Amantea, together with the illustrator Sara Fratini. They planned to create an international short film festival that would open up a space for emerging names from the world of cinema. However, all the cinemas in Amantea had been closed due to lack of public. Thus, following an agreement, the Arena Sicoli, a former open-air cinema, with 938 seats and abandoned for more than two years, was restored.

In four months and with the help of the Amantea's community, the Sicoli family as well as external collaborators, Giulio Vita and Sara Fratini cleaned and renovated the space, making it once again accessible and functional. Young people from Italy and the rest of the world joined the project and worked on the relaunch of the Arena Sicoli, finally reopened for the first edition of the festival in August 2013.

For the second edition, the cinema concession was not renewed. Therefore, the festival took place in the "La Grotta" natural park in Amantea, succeeding in maintaining the original spirit of the open-air cinema.

In 2020, on the occasion of the eighth edition, the Audience Award for the best short film in competition was dedicated to Vitaliano Camarca, creator of the historic Program "Film Mediterraneo" in Amantea.

In 2021, the association purchased land in the center of Amantea to build a space dedicated to culture and events open to the community.

Organizers 

The founders of the festival are Giulio Vita, Sara Fratini, Pablo Cristóbal and Alicia Victoria Palacios Thomas, two members of the Spanish film collective El tornillo de Klaus, bringing together independent artists and audiovisual critics. The idea for the festival was born in Madrid, where Giulio Vita studied cinema, and Sara Fratini - Fine Arts. There they met members of the El Tornillo de Klaus collective and worked together for the launch and the development of La Guarimba International Film Festival.

The association's team is made up of young people aged between 20 and 30, from all over the world, who collaborate to organize the festival as well as various events during the rest of the year.

Etymology of the name

Guarimba, in Venezuelan indigenous language, means "safe place".

This word has a hybrid etymology since the root guari-, from the German Warjgan, means to take refuge or to hide, as well as the Spanish derivative guarida, even though the last one has developed a negative meaning of "refuge of beasts or wild animals" and, by extension, of criminals or people with bad reputations. Concerning the ending -imba, it is formed from "guarida".

Logo

The official logo was created by the Spanish artist Mikel Murillo and depicts a gorilla with a hand above its head. The official colors of the festival are white, green and grey. This image serves as a reference for the artists' exhibition.

The jury of the festival

The jury of the festival is represented by directors, journalists and international critics. The idea of the organization is to promote, through the jury, young personalities of the independent cinema. Some of the members of the jury, among others, have been the Spanish director and actor Nacho Vigalondo, the host Juan Pablo Zaramella, director of Luminaris, winner of the Academy Awards for the best short animated film in 2011, Sam Morrill, editor for Vimeo, as well as Jude Dry, reporter for IndieWire.

Illustration exhibition

For each edition of the festival, Sara Fratini organizes a poster exhibition called "Artists for La Guarimba". The posters are made  each year by several international artists, who interpret the official festival poster in their own style. The exhibition is open during the festival and also in different places of the tour.

Some of the posters made have won important awards and the recognition of AI American Illustration, such as Meredith Jansen's in 2020 and Natalya Balnova in 2015.

Among the artists who made posters for the festival are Jean Jullien, Sawako Kabuki, Egle Zvirblyte, Juan Pablo Zaramella, Elisa Macellari, Antoine Lopez (founder of the Clermont-Ferrand festival), Hannah Jacobs, Cécile Dormeau, Thomas Wellmann, Amélie Fontaine, Laurina Paperina, Powerpaola, Joe Murray, David De Las Heras, Adolfo Serra, Alberto Montt, Liniers, Angela Dalinger, Joe Ciardiello, Rayma.

Editions

La Guarimba is launched on 7 August in 2013.

Until 2020, the festival is held continuously every summer, counting eight editions to date.

First edition 

The first edition of the festival takes place in Amantea from the 5th to the 10th of August 2013.

303 short films from around the world apply to the selection and 10 fiction films, 5 animated films and 5 documentaries are selected. An exhibition of 30 posters of artists from all over the world is held.

As part of the German project "A Wall is A Screen"(being a guest of the festival), several screenings are made in the streets of Amantea.

The opening titles for the first edition are produced by TKSH Film Production and directed by the Venezuelan Adolfo Bueno.

The members of the jury are the Spanish director Nacho Vigalondo, as president, the Italian Claudio Metallo, as well as the Spanish Pablo Cristóbal, Alicia Victoria Palacios Thomas and Carlo Cristóbal, members of El Tornillo de Klaus.

Second edition 

The second edition of the festival takes place in Amantea from the 7th to the 14th of August 2014.

498 short films from all over the world participate in the selection and 20 fiction films, 15 animated films and 10 documentaries are selected. An exhibition of 30 posters of artists from all over the world is held.

For the first time, the festival is able to take place in the La Grotta de Amantea natural park, thanks to the installation of a screen on the slopes of the natural cave.

The jury is composed of the Argentinian Juan Pablo Zaramella, as president, the Italian Carlo Migotto of Lago Film Fest, as well as the Spanish Pablo Cristóbal, Alicia Victoria Palacios Thomas and Carlo Cristóbal, members of El Tornillo de Klaus.

Third edition 

The third edition of the festival takes place in Amantea from the 7th to the 11th of August 2015.

The official selection of short films in the categories fiction, animation and documentary aims to challenge rather than only to entertain for fun and successfully meets an audience of more than thousand spectators.

30 posters by artists from all over the world are exhibited.

Vimeo's presence at the festival enriches the content of this third edition, when the first European conference on independent distribution and Vimeo On Demand is launched. After the conference, a special program created by Sam Morrill is screened.

The jury is made up of the independent director Tomas Sheridan, Vimeo curator Sam Morrill, as well as members of El Tornillo de Klaus.

Fourth edition 

The fourth edition of the festival takes place in Amantea from the 7th to the 11th of August 2016.

More than 1300 short films from all over the world participate in the selection, confirming the important position of La Guarimba on the international scene.

The fourth edition is dedicated to the Chinese and the Japanese cinema, thus celebrating 150 years of cooperation between Italy and the two countries.

During this edition, the selection of La Grotta dei Piccoli- Films for children is launched, with screenings of animated short films in a space dedicated to children.

The president of the jury is Hu Wei, whose short film "Butter Lamp" was in competition the previous year. The other jury members are Aki Isomaya from the Tokyo Shorts Shorts Festival, Joana Gamoes from DocLisboa, Sam Morril from Vimeo, and members of El Tornillo from Klaus.

Fifth edition 

The fifth edition of the festival takes place in Amantea from the 7th  to the 11th of August 2017.

The theme of this edition is the propaganda during the Cold War era. The program brings together short films of different genres from all continents.

The international jury is represented by the director Ruslan Magomadov (Russia), Claudette Godfrey from SXSW (United States), Kyrylo Marikutsa from the Kyiv Short Film Festival (Ukraine), Diane Malherbe from the Clermont-Ferrand Festival (France), as well as Javi Muñíz from Certamen Internacional de Cortos Ciudad de Soria (Spain).

Once again, Vimeo presents its best films "Vimeo Staff Pick" selected by Sam Morrill. In addition, a collaboration have been initiated with Karmala Cultura (Senegal), creating a special program of African films.

An exhibition of illustrations, a natural clothing dyeing workshop (with the Fragmentario collective), an African dance workshop and various conferences are added to the program for the fifth edition.

The second edition of La Grotta dei Piccoli obtains the support of UNICEF Italia.

Sixth edition 

The sixth edition of the festival takes place in Amantea from the 7th to the 11th of August 2018.

1,500 short films from all over the world take part in the selection, with 68 works in competition, divided into the categories Fiction, Animation, Documentary, Insomnia, and La Grotta dei Piccoli - Films for children.

The international jury is composed of: the Belgian author, film critic and director, :fr:Djia Mambu, who also works in the Democratic Republic of Congo; IndieWire journalist Jude Dry (United States); and director Thomas Horat (Switzerland).

The festival includes an exhibition of illustrations, a film residency project, two concerts, as well as a conference day entitled "Young African filmmakers and the future of African cinema".

Seventh edition 

The seventh edition of the festival takes place in Amantea from the 7th to the 11th of August 2019.

More than 1000 short films participate in the selection. 152 works from 42 different countries, divided into the categories Fiction, Animation, Documentary, Insomnia and La Grotta dei Piccoli - Children's film, are selected.

The international jury is composed of Jeanette Bonds (United States), founder and director of the GLAS Animation Festival, Éva Katinka Bógnar (Hungary), teacher and animation director, as well as Norma Guevara (France), director of the Women Film Festival Network.

The festival is launched with a collective cleaning of Amantea's beach, in collaboration with the NGO - Parley For The Oceans. The following days, workshops, concerts, a day of conferences for the industry, a narration seminar in collaboration with Scuola Holden, photographic exhibitions and an exhibition of illustrations are organized.

Eighth edition 

The eighth edition of the festival takes place in Amantea from the 7th to the 12th of August 2020. Despite the health crisis situation due to the COVID-19 epidemic which has forced the majority of festivals to be held online, La Guarimba makes it face-to-face, registering more than 3000 admissions in 6 days.

1160 short films participate in the selection. 160 works coming from 54 countries of all the contents, and divided in the categories Fiction, Animation, Documentary, Insomnia, La Grotta dei Piccoli - Films for children are selected for the competition.

The eighth edition of the festival receives the Medal of the Representation of the President of the Republic - Sergio Mattarella, the High Patronage of the European Parliament, the Patronage of the Council of Ministers, and received the support of the embassies of the Kingdom of the Netherlands, the Federal German Republic, the Republic of Ireland, Canada, Australia, Sweden, Norway, the Austrian Cultural Forum, as well as the Flanders State of Arts.

In February 2020, the municipality of Amantea is dissolved due to fraud and mafia infiltration. This causes the closure of La Grotta Park throughout the year. Therefore, the association engages in an urban restoration project, cleaning up the park and restoring the facilities, encouraging the involvement of the whole community, thus allowing the park to reopen to the public.

Ninth edition 
The ninth edition of the festival takes place in Amantea from August 7 to 12, 2021.

1174 short films participated in the selection, with 172 films in competition from 56 countries from all continents (5 African countries, 13 Asian, 28 European, 9 American, 1 Oceanic), divided into the following categories: fiction, animation, documentary, experimental, La Grotta dei Piccoli - Children's Film.

The ninth edition received the Medal of Representation of the President of the Republic Sergio Mattarella, the High Patronage of the European Parliament, the Patronage of the Council of Ministers and the Award of Representation of the Chamber of Deputies ; and was realized thanks to the support of the Ministry of Culture and the Embassy of the United States in Italy, in collaboration with the European Commission, the Embassy of the Kingdom of the Netherlands, the Austrian Cultural Forum, the Embassy of the Federal Republic of Germany in Italy, the Embassy of Switzerland for Italy, Malta and San Marino, the Embassy of Lithuania in Italy, the Embassy of Ireland in Italy, the Embassy of Norway, the Embassy of Australia, the Embassy of Canada, the Flemish State of the Arts, and the Polish Institute in Rome.

Due to the collapse of a rocky ridge in the historic center of Amantea, which made the Parco La Grotta unusable, the festival had to change location. The idea was to recover an abandoned parking lot, as part of a larger urban renewal project that led to the cleaning and clearing of the area, as well as the creation of two murals by street artists Sara Fratini and Cesáh.

Tenth edition 
The tenth edition of the festival took place in Amantea from August 7 to 12, 2022.

This edition received the same rewards as the previous years.

On the tenth anniversary of the festival, 163 short films have been screened, from 54 countries of all continents.

There were 5 categories: Fiction, Animation, Documentary, Videoclip and Insomnia – Experimental Films. Like every year, La grotta dei Piccoli also presented a selection of a hundred short films for children and young people. In celebration of its anniversary, the festival also presented 4 special programs: Indigenous Films, dedicated to 5 indigenous cultures from 5 different continents; A Screen for Glas Animation which screened short films from this Californian festival, partner of La Guarimba; Sláva Ukrayíni!, a screening of ukrainian movies in support of the directors affected by the conflict; Taiwan Focus which celebrated the taiwanese independant cinema and hosted the Ambassador of Taiwan, Andrea Sing-Ying Lee, at the Holy See.

Legal battles

Conflict between open air summer festivals and distributors 

During the preparation of the eighth edition of the festival, La Guarimba is involved in a complaint against the professional associations of distributors and film directors, Anica and Anec, who had given "written indications to Italian and foreign distributors not to not grant licenses for the screening of films in free entry on Italian territory, which resulted in 235 denied permits out of 263 applications for screening permits, although the films have completed their period of commercial exploitation in theatres ", as indicated during the parliamentary question of June 18, 2020. On June 24, 2020, the authority overseeing competition law opened a preliminary investigation against Anica, Anec and Anec Lazio for "obstacles for the concession of films to the open-air free cinemas ".

In order to guarantee the continuity of the provision of a free service to the community aimed at promoting film culture in the territory, parliamentarians Lorenzo Fioramonti, Andrea Cecconi, Matteo Orfini, Nicola Fratoianni, Alessandro Fusacchia, Flavia Piccoli Nardelli and Paolo Lattanzio have asked the Ministry of Culture to monitor the action of complaint involving La Guarimba International Film Festival together with other Italian associations. The parliamentarians recognized the importance of the activity carried out by the associations mentioned in the case on cultural and social level, which "allow citizens from all social classes to have access to culture, with the aim of give a new market value to dated or independent works and contribute to the creation of a film education ", also guaranteeing psychological and social support and acting as a motor of cultural offer in an emergency period during which the Italy has been particularly affected.

It was underlined that "the films have already concluded their period of commercial exploitation in the cinemas, in free-to-air television, in paid television, in streaming and on DVD and do not include titles present on the market in the current film season ", thus contesting the indications of Anica and Anec who, in the past, did not grant licenses for the screenings during free film event on the Italian territory, thus affecting negatively the free service offered by cultural associations and encouraging organizers to consider the possibility of payment for citizens.

The case of Abbas Nadeem 

In July 2020, shortly before the festival, La Guarimba denounced to the press a case of racism suffered by Abbas Mian Nadeem, a young Pakistani immunosuppressed who ended up among the migrants expelled from Amantea by mistake because of a positive Covid test, and who also received threats from the 'Ndrangheta (Calabrian mafia). The association worked with the authorities to allow his return to Amantea, helping him to find legal assistance, in particular thanks to the involvement of Italian and European deputies which shed light on the case.

Position in favor of Ukraine 
The festival took a clear stand in the context of the Russian invasion of Ukraine in 2022, through several actions. All Ukrainian filmmakers have been granted an exemption from paying registration for the festival, with the creation of the special program Sláva Ukryíni!. All producers, directors and distributors who expressed clear positions in favor of Putin were excluded, while Russian directors who took a public stand against the invasion were selected. The festival organized the screening of the documentary The Earth is Blue as an Orange, directed by Iryna Tsilyk, winner of the Director's Award in the "World Cinema Documentary" category at the Sundance Film Festival 2020.

The Monkey's School

In 2014, the cultural association La Guarimba wins a public tender from the Apulia region which allows it to create The Monkey's School (Scuola Delle Scimmie). It is the first accessible independent film and illustration school based on the Montessori model of participatory democracy. During the month of September 2014, La Guarimba creates a workshop with 45 young people on the subjects of illustration and cinema.

On tour

After each edition, La Guarimba organizes a tour during which the films in competition are presented in different places.

In 2013, the festival participates in the fourth edition of Pane, Web e Salame as the first Calabrian representative of the event.

As part of the sixth edition of the Workshop on Social Enterprise, held in Riva del Garda in 2013, Giulio Vita is invited to speak about the impact that the reopening of the Arena Sicoli has had on the community of Amantea during the festival.

In September 2013, La Guarimba is invited by the Cultural Association La Scheggia to participate in the Cinema Beltrade film cycle. The award-winning short films in the first edition are screened there, accompanied by a speech by the director of the winning documentary short, Benedetta Panisson.

In June 2015, TedxPompeii invites Giulio Vita, the founder of the festival, to tell the story of La Guarimba.

Awards

References

Film festivals in Italy
Film festivals in Europe
Short film festivals